Edward Campbell Little (December 14, 1858 – June 27, 1924) was a U.S. Representative from Kansas.

Life
Born in Newark, Ohio, Little moved to Kansas in 1866 with his parents, who settled in Olathe. He attended the public schools of Abilene, Kansas and graduated from the University of Kansas in Lawrence in 1883. For several years, he was connected with the Santa Fe Railroad. After studying law, he was admitted to the bar in 1886 and commenced practice in Lawrence.

Little served as chairman of the Republican State convention in 1888. In 1889, he was the city attorney of Ness City, and from 1890 to 1892, he was prosecuting attorney of Dickinson County. He served as delegate at large to the Republican National Convention in 1892.

In 1892 and 1893, Little was Minister Resident to Egypt. In 1896 and 1897, he was the private secretary of Governor John W. Leedy. He unsuccessfully ran for senator in 1897. During the Spanish–American War, from 1898 to 1899, he was lieutenant colonel of the Twentieth Regiment, Kansas Volunteers. This service earned him the Spanish War Service Medal, and the Philippine Campaign Medal. In 1908, he settled in Kansas City, Kansas.

Little was elected to the Sixty-fifth and to the three succeeding Congresses, from Kansas's 2nd congressional district, and served from March 4, 1917, until his death in Washington, D.C. on June 27, 1924.

In the Sixty-sixth through Sixty-eighth Congresses, he was chairman of the Committee on Revision of Laws. He was one of the 50 representatives who on April 5, 1917 voted against declaring war on Germany

Little is buried in the City Cemetery of Abilene, Kansas.

See also
List of United States Congress members who died in office (1900–49)

References

1858 births
1924 deaths
Politicians from Newark, Ohio
Ambassadors of the United States to Egypt
United States Army officers
Politicians from Olathe, Kansas
People from Abilene, Kansas
19th-century American diplomats
Republican Party members of the United States House of Representatives from Kansas
People from Lawrence, Kansas
People from Ness City, Kansas